List of authors of South African animal taxa is a list of authors who have described or revised South African animals, and the standard forms used for identification of those authors in the zoological literature.

The complete entry for each author is given on a single line showing the standard form for their name, name link, dates and other names by which they have been known. Following this comes a list of major groups they have worked on. In cases where there is more than one person who may be referred to by a name, one or more dates of publication may help with disambiguation.

The major groups are 
 Invertebrate
 Porifera
 Ctenophores
 Cnidarians
 Platyhelminthes
 Nematodes
 Nemerteans
 Annelids
 Arthropods
 Bryozoans
 Brachiopods
 Molluscs
 Echinoderms
 Tunicates
 Vertebrates
 Fish
 Amphibians
 Birds
 Mammals
 Reptiles

The dates given are those of birth and death where one or both are available. If neither is known, a date on which the author is known to have published a name (usually the earliest, and optionally also the latest, if more than one is known) is given preceded by 'fl.' (floruit).

A

 Abbott fl. 1861
 Ahl fl. 1789
 Alcock fl. 1896 – Alfred William Alcock (1859-1933)
 Andriashev fl. 1962 – Anatoly Petrovich Andriashev (1910–2009)
 Ascanius fl.1772

B

 Balushkin fl. 1988 – Arkadii Vladimirovich Balushkin 
 Barnard fl. 1923
 Bass fl. 1975
 Bean fl. 1895 - 1925
 Bekker fl. 1967
 Bennett fl. 1831
 Bertelsen fl. 1976 – E. Bertelsen
 Branch – William Roy Branch 1946 - 2018, Herpetology
 Brauer fl. 1906
 Bibron fl. 1839
 Bleeker fl. 1851 – Pieter Bleeker (1819–1878)
 Bloch fl. 1923
 Bocage fl. 1864 – José Vicente Barbosa du Bocage (1823–1907)
 Bolin fl. 1946
 Bonaparte fl. 1832 – Charles Lucien Jules Laurent Bonaparte (1794–1857) ornithology
 Bonnaterre fl. 178 – Pierre Joseph Bonnaterre (1747–1804)
 Borodin fl. 1928 – Nikolai Andreyevich Borodin (1861–1937)
 Borodulina fl. 1977
 Boulenger fl. 1902
 Broussonet fl. 1782
 Brünnich fl. 1788
 Bussing fl. 1966 (Bussing & Bussing)
 Bussing fl. 1966 (x2)
 Byrne fl. 1909

C

 Capello fl. 1864
 Castelnau fl. 1861
 Castle fl. 1968
 Cocco fl.1829
 Cohen fl. 1981
 Compagno fl. 1984
 Cramer fl. 1897
 Cressy fl. 1979
 Cuvier fl. 1829

D

 Davies fl. 1950
 Day fl. 1873
 D'Aubrey fl. 1975
 DeFilippi fl. 1857
 De Kay fl. 1842
 Donndorff fl. 1789
 Duméril fl. 1865

E

 Ebert fl. 1990
 Ege fl.1933
 Ehrenberg fl. 1899
 Esmark fl. 1871
 Euphrasen fl. 1790

F

 Forsskål fl. 1775
 Forster fl. 1801
 Fowler fl. 1927 
 Franca fl. 1960

G

 Gaimard fl. 1824
 Garman fl. 1899
 Gibbs fl. 1960
 Giglioli fl.1884
 Gilbert fl. 1892
 Gilchrist fl. 1911
 Gill fl. 1884
 Giorna fl. 1809
 Gmelin fl. 1789
 Gomon fl. 1982
 Goode fl. 1895
 Griffith fl. 1834
 Gunnerus fl. 1765
 Günther fl. 1867

H

 Hamilton fl. 1822
 Hamilton-Buchanan fl. 1822
 Hector fl. 1975
 Heemstra fl. 1980
 Hemprich fl. 1899
 Henle fl. 1841
 Herrmann fl. 1783
 Hjort fl. 1912
 Holt fl. 1909
 Hubbs fl. 1977
 Hulley fl. 1966
 Hutton fl. 1875

I

 Iwamoto fl. 1977

J

 Jenyns fl. 1842
 Johnson fl. 1862
 Jordan fl. 1898, 1902

K

 Kannemeyer fl. 1984
 Kaup fl. 1856
 Klunzinger fl. 1871
 Koefoed fl. 1955
 Krefft fl. 1976 G. Krefft
 Kristnasamy fl. 1975
 Krøyer fl. 1845

L

 Lacepède fl. 1803
 Latham fl. 1794
 Latreille fl. 1804
 Lay fl. 1839
 Leseuer fl. 1818
 Lesson fl. 1828
 Linnaeus fl. 1758
 Lloyd fl. 1908
 Lönnberg fl. 1905
 Lowe fl. 1840
 Lütken fl. 1892

M

 Makushok fl. 1976
 Marshall – Norman Bertram Marshall (1915–1996) ichthyologist
 Matsubara fl. 1936, 1953
 Maul fl.1948
 McCann fl. 1980
 McClelland fl. 1844
 McCosker fl. 1882
 McCulloch fl. 1915
 McKnight fl. 1980
 McLeay fl. 1882
 Mead fl. 1959
 Merrett fl. 1973
 Millard – Naomi A. H. Millard (1914–1997) Hydroida 
 Miyosi fl. 1939
 Mukhacheva fl. 1964
 Müller fl. 1834

N

 Nafpaktitis (x2) fl. 1969
 Nakamura fl. 1955
 Nardo fl. 1827
 Nielsen fl. 1978
 Nodder fl. 1785
 Norman fl. 1922

O

 Ogilby fl. 1899
 Olfers fl. 1831
 Osorio fl. 1917

P

 Pappenheim fl. 1914
 Parin fl. 1972
 Parr fl. 1928
 Paxton fl. 1968
 Penrith fl. 1966
 Péron fl. 1822
 Peters fl. 1855
 Petit fl.1934
 Pietschmann fl. 1913
 Poey fl. 1861
 Post fl. 1973

Q

 Quoy fl. 1824

R

 Radcliffe fl. 1912
 Rafinesque fl. 1810
 Ramsay fl. 1881
 Randall fl. 1882
 Regan fl. 1913
 Reinhardt fl. 1825
 Richardson fl. 1848
 Risso fl. 1810
 Rofen fl. 1963
 Roule fl. 1922
 Rüppell fl. 1837
 Russell fl. 1979
 Ryder fl. 1883

S

 Saint Hilaire fl. 1817
 Sazonov fl. 1980
 Schcherbachev fl.1976
 Schinz fl. 1822
 Schlegel fl. 1850
 Schmidt fl. 1912
 Schneider fl. 1923
 Schultz fl. 1953
 Scott fl. 1976
 Seale fl. 1906
 Shaw fl. 1785, 1791
 Sivertsen fl. 1945
 Smale fl. 1985
 Smith fl. 1980
 Smith fl. 1834
 Smith fl. 1912
 Snyder fl. 1902
 Springer fl. 1950
 Starks fl. 1904
 Stehman fl. 1990
 Steindachner fl. 1867
 Strömman fl. 1896
 Swart fl. 1923

T

 Tåning fl. 1928 Åge Vedel Tåning (1890-1958)
 Taylor fl. 1982
 Temminck fl. 1850
 Thompson fl. 1911
 Thunberg fl. 1787
 Trewavas fl. 1929
 Trinov fl. 1988

U

V

 Vahl fl. 1797
 Vaillant fl. 1888
 Valenciennes fl. 1841
 van Bonde fl. 1923
 van Hasselt fl. 1823
 Verany fl. 1857

W

 Waite fl. 1916
 Wallace fl. 1967
 Waller fl. 1969
 Weber fl. 1913
 Welsh fl. 1923
 Whitley fl. 1931
 Williams fl. 1896
 Wongratana fl. 1983

X

Y

Z

 Zubrigg fl. 1976
 Zugmayer fl. 1911

See also 
 List of authors of names published under the ICZN
 List of authors of South African botanical taxa
 List of botanists by author abbreviation
 International Code of Zoological Nomenclature

References

External links 
Wikispecies catalogue of taxon authorities